"The Adventure of the Three Garridebs" is one of the 56 Sherlock Holmes short stories written by British author Sir Arthur Conan Doyle. One of the 12 stories in the cycle collected as The Case-Book of Sherlock Holmes (1927), it was first published in Collier's in the United States on 25 October 1924, and in The Strand Magazine in the United Kingdom in January 1925.

According to Dr. Watson's opening narration, this story is set at "the latter end of June, 1902 ... the same month that Holmes refused a knighthood for services which may perhaps some day be described." This is a parallel to the knighthood of Arthur Conan Doyle around the same time.

Plot

Holmes receives a letter from a Nathan Garrideb of 136 Little Ryder Street, asking for help in a most peculiar quest. He is looking for another man with his unusual surname, for it will mean a $5 million inheritance for him. He has been approached by another man, John Garrideb of Kansas, who says that he needs to find others with the same last name.

The American Garrideb comes to see Holmes and Watson at 221B Baker Street, and is apparently not very pleased that Nathan Garrideb has involved a detective. Garrideb, who claims to be a lawyer, spins a ridiculous story about Alexander Hamilton Garrideb, a millionaire land tycoon he met in Kansas. Hamilton Garrideb bequeathed his $15 million estate to John Garrideb on the provision that he find two more Garridebs to share it with equally. He came to England to seek out people with the name, having failed  in his own country. So far, he has found only Nathan.

During the interview, Holmes secretly deduces that Garrideb has been in London for a long time, not newly arrived as he claims. When Holmes invents a fictitious Kansas politician, Garrideb says he once knew him. Holmes does not reveal that he knows Garrideb is lying, and instead arranges a private visit with Nathan Garrideb. Upon arrival at Little Ryder Street, Holmes observes Nathan Garrideb's nameplate outside the house. It has obviously been there for years; so Holmes concludes that Garrideb is at least his true surname.

It turns out that Nathan Garrideb is an elderly eccentric who collects everything from ancient coins to old bones.  Garrideb's rooms look like a small museum, but he has nothing of financial value in his collection. Holmes finds out that John Garrideb has never asked for any money, nor has he suggested any course of action. Nathan Garrideb has no reason, it seems, to be suspicious of John Garrideb.

During Holmes's and Watson's visit, John Garrideb arrives, having supposedly found a newspaper advertisement purportedly placed by one Howard Garrideb in the course of his everyday business. Holmes silently observes that John Garrideb must have placed the advertisement himself; the terms and spelling are distinctly American, not British. Despite Nathan Garrideb's objections, for he is a man who never travels, John Garrideb insists that Nathan go to Birmingham and meet this Howard Garrideb. Holmes realizes that the whole scheme is John Garrideb's way to get Nathan out of the way for a while. 

The next day, Holmes goes to see Inspector Lestrade at Scotland Yard and identifies John Garrideb as James Winter alias Morecroft alias "Killer" Evans, who escaped prison after shooting three men in the States. In London, he killed Rodger Prescott, a Chicago forger whose description matches the former occupant of Nathan Garrideb's room. Holmes and Watson go to Garrideb's home armed with revolvers. They do not have to wait long before Winter shows up. From their hiding place, Holmes and Watson see the criminal use a "jemmy" to open a trapdoor, revealing a little cellar. They capture Winter, but not before he manages to shoot twice, striking Watson in the leg. For once, Holmes shows his human side; he is distraught over Watson's injury, and strikes Winter on the head with the butt of a gun hard enough to draw blood, vowing that the villain would have never left the rooms alive if he had killed Watson. Fortunately, Watson's wound is superficial. The little cellar contains a printing press and stacks of counterfeit banknotes, hidden there by Prescott, the man that Winter killed.

Winter is sent back to prison. Nathan Garrideb ends up in a nursing home, so great is his disappointment, but many CID men are pleased that Prescott's equipment has at last been found. Watson seems the happiest at the adventure's outcome, despite being hurt, declaring, "It was worth a wound, it was worth many wounds, to know the depth of loyalty and love which lay behind that cold mask", from the sight of Holmes's panic and rage over his friend's shooting.

Publication history

"The Adventure of the Three Garridebs" was published in the US in Collier's on 25 October 1924, and in the UK in The Strand Magazine in January 1925. The story was published with three illustrations by John Richard Flanagan in Collier's, and with five illustrations by Howard K. Elcock in the Strand. It was included in the short story collection The Case-Book of Sherlock Holmes, which was published in the UK and the US in June 1927.

As noted by Wilma Morgan, "The Three Garridebs" takes up many plot elements used in the much earlier story "The Red-Headed League". "Both stories feature a rather naive, sedentary, middle aged bachelor who happens to sit on a location of great interest to cunning criminals. And in both stories, a very elaborate hoax is cooked up, involving a fake bequest by a fictional rich American, in order to make the bachelor go away and leave the criminals a clear field — which would have worked fine but for Sherlock Holmes seeing through the hoax. One difference between the two stories — and I am not sure that it is an improvement — is that in the second case, unlike the first, the innocent bachelor is deeply hurt and damaged by the hoax worked on him."

Adaptations

Radio

The story was adapted by Edith Meiser as an episode of the American radio series The Adventures of Sherlock Holmes. The episode aired on 2 June 1932, with Richard Gordon as Sherlock Holmes and Leigh Lovell as Dr. Watson.

Other dramatisations of the story aired on the American radio series The New Adventures of Sherlock Holmes on 25 December 1939 (with Basil Rathbone as Holmes and Nigel Bruce as Watson, and also adapted by Meiser) and 9 May 1949 (with John Stanley as Holmes and Wendell Holmes as Watson).

A radio adaptation of the story, dramatised by Michael Hardwick, aired in 1964 on the BBC Light Programme, as part of the 1952–1969 radio series starring Carleton Hobbs as Holmes and Norman Shelley as Watson.

"The Three Garridebs" was dramatised for BBC Radio 4 in 1994 by David Ashton as part of the 1989–1998 radio series starring Clive Merrison as Holmes and Michael Williams as Watson, featuring Lou Hirsch as John Garrideb.

In 2009, the story was adapted for radio as part of The Classic Adventures of Sherlock Holmes, a series on the American radio show Imagination Theatre, with John Patrick Lowrie as Holmes and Lawrence Albert as Watson.

Television

The then-newly-formed NBC sought permission from Lady Conan Doyle to produce The Three Garridebs for American television in 1937. This would be the first televised adaptation of Doyle's detective. Louis Hector was cast as Holmes with William Podmore as Watson.

In 1994 the story was again adapted for television. Jeremy Brett was taken ill during the production of the Granada Television adaptation of this story (which was also a conflation with "The Adventure of the Mazarin Stone" and transmitted under the latter title) and so Holmes's role in the plot was taken by Mycroft Holmes with Charles Gray called in at short notice to reprise his role as Sherlock's older brother. Some note that "In addition to being immensely entertaining, The Memoirs of Sherlock Holmes has the unfortunate bonus of tracing the decline of Jeremy Brett's health, episode by episode."

The case is referenced in the Sherlock episode "The Final Problem", when the third Holmes sibling, Eurus Holmes, having taken control of her island prison, challenges Sherlock to identify which of the three Garrideb brothers (Nathan, Howard and Alex) murdered a man named Evans some months ago or she will kill all three. Sherlock is able to identify which brother committed the crime based on photographs and a description of the shooting, eliminating the other two as one lacked the right motor control and the other wore glasses that would have broken when the rifle he used recoiled. However, Eurus kills the two innocent brothers instead, and when Watson expresses shock she executes the guilty one anyway just to see if it feels any different.

References

Sources

External links

1924 short stories
Three Garridebs
Works originally published in Collier's